McClelland Sculpture Park and Gallery (stylised as McClelland Sculpture Park+Gallery) is an Australian sculpture park and gallery located in Langwarrin (near Frankston) in Melbourne, Victoria. It displays more than 100 large-scale works by prominent Australian sculptors in 16 hectares of bush and landscaped gardens.

Permanent Collection 
 Bruce Armstrong : City (1987)
 George Baldessin : Untitled (1966/67)
 Geoffrey Bartlett : The rise of the flowering plants (1984)
 Ewan Coates (1965, Melbourne) : Three pillars of instant gratification (2007)
 Peter Corlett (1944) : Tarax Play Sculpture (1969), La Stupenda (2003)
  Vincas Jomantas (1922-2001) : Landing object II (1992)
 John Kelly (1965, Bristol (U.K.) : Maquette for a public monument (2003), Untitled (2006)
 Inge King (1918, Berlin): Flight Arrested (1964), Jabaroo (1984), Island Sculpture (1991)
 Clifford Last (1918 - 1991) : Metamorphosis II (1987)
 Michael Le Grand: Schism (2006)
 Clement Meadmore (1929, Melbourne) : Paraphernalia (1999)
 Robert Owen: Double Vision Nr. 2 (2003)
 Adrian Page : Torus - Hidden and revealed (2003)
 Lenton Parr (1924 - 2003, Melbourne): Custom House Screen
 Phil Price (1965, Nelson, New-Zealand): Ratytus (2005)
 Anthony Pryor (1951 - 1991, Melbourne): Sea Legend (1991-2000)
 Norma Redpath (1928, Melbourne) : Untitled (1964), Desert Arch (1968), Landscape Caryatid (1980/85)
 Ron Robertson-Swann (1941, Sydney) : Turn (1988), Lunar chariot (2003)
 Lisa Roet (1967, Melbourne) : White Ape (2005)
 Peter Schipperheyn (1955, Melbourne) : Thus Spake Zarathustra (2006)
 Ken Unsworth (1931, Melbourne) : Annulus of stones (2007)
 David Wilson (1947, Londen): Black Vessel (1977), Earth (1978), Dry pool (1979), Shore column (1981), Stump stall (1985) en Around the mirror (1987)

References

External links 

 McClelland Sculpture Park+Gallery web page

Photo gallery 

Art museums and galleries in Melbourne
Art galleries established in 1971
Sculpture gardens, trails and parks in Australia
Buildings and structures in the City of Frankston
1971 establishments in Australia